Apulanta is a Finnish rock band, founded in 1991 when its members were in their mid-teens.

In September 2009, Apulanta members established an independent label, Päijät-Hämeen Sorto ja Riisto ("Päijänne Tavastian Oppression and Exploitation"). Since its beginnings, the label has so far gotten one artist, pop singer Kaija Koo in the summer of 2010. In February 2011, they revealed that they had a new prospective artist in the label, though not disclosing their name.

Members

Current members
 Toni Wirtanen – lead vocals and guitar (+ bass 1991–1992) (1991–)
 Simo ”Sipe” Santapukki – drums and backing vocals (1991–)
 Ville Mäkinen – bass guitar and contrabass (2014-)

Former members
 Pauli Hauta-aho – touring guitar (2016)
 Sami ”Parta-Sami” Lehtinen – bass and backing vocals (touring guitar 2001–2004) (2005–2014)
 Antti Lautala – lead vocals and guitar (+ bass 1991–1992) (1991–1994)
 Amanda ”Mandy” Gaynor – bass, trombone and vocals (1992–1993)
 Tuukka Temonen – bass (1993–2004)
 Jani Törmälä – touring guitar (1997, 1998, 2000)
 Sami Yli-Pihlaja – touring guitar (1998–1999, 2000)
 Marzi Nyman – touring guitar (2000)
 Markus "Masi" Hukari – touring guitar (2001)

Discography

Studio albums

Compilation albums

Live albums

English albums

Singles and EPs

DVDs
Liikkuvat kuvat (in English "Motion Pictures", 2002)
Kesäaine ("Summer Essay", 2006)

See also
 List of best-selling music artists in Finland

References

External links

Official site

Finnish musical groups
Musical groups established in 1991